Faith is the third album by Hyde, released on April 26, 2006. The limited edition included a DVD with the music video for the two singles: "Countdown" and "Season's Call". The overseas version of the album was released on June 27, 2006. All songs were arranged by Hyde and K.A.Z, his future Vamps bandmate. It peaked at number 2 on the Oricon weekly chart.

Themes 
The Western press has noted Faith for its lyrics' spiritual subject matter as the album contains references to Christianity. In an interview with the German dark music magazine Orkus, the interviewer asked Hyde: "What can we hear from your latest release?" Hyde replied:

Tour 
A five-month tour promoting Faith was scheduled, beginning in April 2006.  Most locations are in Japan; however, after Hyde and Itachi signed on with Sony's North American-based Tofu Records, two concerts in the United States were added to the line up.

The first concert announced was scheduled for July 5, 2006, located in San Francisco, California.  Shortly after tickets sold out for the event, a second concert was confirmed to be held July 2, in Anaheim, California. In the end, two US concerts as well as an appearance for a question and answer session in Anaheim at the anime convention Anime Expo, were added to Hyde's mini US tour.

Track listing

Personnel
 Hyde – vocals, guitars, arranger, production, songwriter, mastering
 Craig Adams - bass guitar (tracks 2, 5)
 Sean Beavan – mixing
 Brian Gardner – mastering
 Scott Garrett – drums
 Lynne Hobday – vocals (tracks 7, 10)
 Steven Johnson – production
 K.A.Z – production, songwriter
 Shinya "Robot" Kishiro – production
 Kouichi Kobayashi – photography
 Keiji Kondo – engineering
 Stoeps Langensteiner – photography
 Danny Lohner – bass guitar (tracks  1, 3, 4, 6, 7, 8, 9, 10)
 Koichi Matsuoka "Dentsu" – art direction
 Satoshi Mishiba – piano (track 1)
 Michihiko Nakayama – executive producer
 Motiki Ohashi – art direction, design
 Takao Saiki – production
 Takayuki Saito – engineering
 Naoto Tanemura – engineering
 George Tetsumoto – production
 Osami Yabuta – photography
 Kazuhiro Yoneda – photography

References 

2006 albums
Hyde (musician) albums